The Itoh Emi 14 was a Japanese biplane designed in 1920 for a long distance competitive flight from Tokyo to Osaka and back, which it won. It was also successful at a contest later that summer, before suffering terminal structural failure during aerobatics a few weeks later.

Design and development

Four companies prepared designs but only the Nakajama Type 7 and the Itoh Emi 14 were ready when the race was due.

For many early, long distance flights the main design challenge was to ensure the aircraft, heavily loaded with fuel, could become airborne in the distance available. Otherwise the Emi 14 was a conventional two bay biplane with rectangular plan wings braced together with pairs of vertical, parallel interplane struts. Two  parallel pairs of short cabane struts braced the central upper wing to the upper fuselage longerons. The Emi 14, like some other Itoh designs, had overhung ailerons, placed only on the upper wing.

The Emi 14 was powered by a  Gorham engine in a smoothly-tapered cowling but with its upper half exposed. Its flat, narrow, rectangular radiator was attached edge on and vertically just behind on the port side, where the engine cowling joined a flat-sided fuselage. It was originally designed with two open cockpits and flown from the rear seat, but for the long round trip the forward cockpit was used to hold extra fuel.  There was a small, central trailing edge cut-out to improve the pilot's upward field of view. The  tailplane was mounted on top of the fuselage and the fin was triangular, with a rounded rudder.

Its fixed undercarriage was of the single axle type, mounted on V-struts from the lower fuselage longerons. During development the Emi 14 had a conventional tailskid but for the challenging contest flight takeoff the tail was raised on a wheeled dolly, dropped as the Emi 14 became airborne.

Operational history

The date of the Emi 14's first flight is not known but it was ready on 21 April 1920, the preset contest date. Both it and the Nakajama Type 7, piloted by Kintaro Iinuma, took off successfully and began the outward leg but Iinuma soon ran into thick fog, became lost and crashed into Mount Tanzawa. He was badly injured but survived. The flight was seen as a big step forward in Japan's aeronautical progress. The Itoh Aeroplane Research Studio were awarded a 5000 yen prize and Yamagata received the same amount as a personal reward plus another 600 yen a month for three years, though he did not live to collect much of it.

Together these prizes were worth 8000 yen.

At the end of August Yamagata was practising loops for an upcoming display when a wing detached, killing him. No more Emi 14s were built.

Specifications

References

Biplanes
Single-engined tractor aircraft
1920s Japanese civil aircraft
14